Sarmizegetusa may refer to several places in present-day Romania:

 Sarmizegetusa Regia, the former Dacian capital
 Battle of Sarmizegetusa, a siege of Sarmizegetusa, the capital of Dacia, fought in 106
 Sarmizegetusa Ulpia Traiana, the former capital of Roman Dacia
 Sarmizegetusa, Hunedoara, a modern-day commune